Pub-Kalakuchi, also spelled as Pub Kalakuchi, is a census village in Nalbari district, Assam, India. According to the 2011 Census of India, Pub-Kalakuchi village has a total population of 2,567 people including 1,323 males and 1,244 females with a literacy rate of 66.61%.

References 

Villages in Nalbari district